Area code 505 is a telephone area code in the North American Numbering Plan (NANP) for the U.S. state of New Mexico. Its numbering plan area (NPA) comprises the northwestern and central portions of the state, including the Albuquerque metropolitan area, Gallup, Santa Fe, and Farmington. The area code is one of the original North American area codes established in October 1947. Until October 7, 2007, it served the entire state. 

Due to the increasing demand for new numbers, area code 505 was split on October 7, 2007. Northwestern and central New Mexico continued to be served by the 505 area code, while the remainder of the state switched to area code 575. The issue was decided in 2006 by vote of the New Mexico Public Regulation Commission, with a 3–2 majority in favor of allowing the Albuquerque area to keep the old area code.

The need for a new code had been clear since at least 2000, but the PRC's initial votes for Albuquerque and Santa Fe to switch to a new area code and the rest of the state to keep the old 505 area code (including the Farmington and Gallup areas that are now part of the current 505 area code) were met with vocal opposition. Amid heightening tensions between the urban and rural areas of the state, the commission eventually chose to put off the decision until 2006 after number pooling made the immediate addition of a new code unnecessary.

Prior to October 2021, area code 505 had telephone numbers assigned for the central office code 988. In 2020, 988 was designated nationwide as a dialing code for the National Suicide Prevention Lifeline, which created a conflict for exchanges that permit seven-digit dialing. This area code was therefore scheduled to transition to ten-digit dialing by October 24, 2021.

"The 505" (a reference to the area code for New Mexico) is a slang term indicating the state of New Mexico.

References

External links

505
505
Telecommunications-related introductions in 1947